Rhabdoweisiaceae is a family of haplolepideous mosses (Dicranidae) in the order Dicranales. It consists of 16 genera.

Genera

The family Rhabdoweisiaceae contains 16 genera:

Amphidium  
Arctoa 
Cynodontium 
Dichodontium  
Dicranoweisia  (e.g. Dicranoweisia crispula)
Glyphomitrium 
Holodontium 
Hymenoloma 
Kiaeria 
Oncophorus 
Oreas 
Oreoweisia 
Pseudohyophila 
Rhabdoweisia 
Symblepharis 
Verrucidens

References

Moss families
Dicranales